The 64th Assembly District of Wisconsin is one of 99 districts in the Wisconsin State Assembly.  Located in southeast Wisconsin, the district comprises northeast corner of Kenosha County and the southeast corner of Racine County, including part of the cities of Racine and Kenosha, as well as the village of Elmwood Park and parts of the villages of Somers and Mount Pleasant east of Wisconsin Highway 31.  The district also contains the University of Wisconsin–Parkside campus, Carthage College, and the Kenosha campus of Gateway Technical College. The district is represented by Democrat Tip McGuire, since May 2019.

The 64th Assembly District is located within Wisconsin's 22nd Senate district, along with the 65th and 66th Assembly districts.

List of past representatives

Electoral history

References 

Wisconsin State Assembly districts
Kenosha County, Wisconsin
Racine County, Wisconsin